Aberdeen is a rural locality in the local government area (LGA) of Devonport in the North-west and west LGA region of Tasmania. The 2021 census recorded a population of 268 for Aberdeen.

History 
Aberdeen was gazetted as a locality in 1963. The name was not in official use until about 1915. 

Coal was discovered in the area in 1855, and Scottish miners may have unofficially named it Aberdeen.

Geography
The Don River flows through the south-west corner and then forms much of the western boundary.

Road infrastructure 
Route C146 (Melrose Road) runs through from north to south-east.

References

Towns in Tasmania
Devonport, Tasmania